Gary White (born 8 December 1967 in Sydney), is an Australian baseball player. He competed at the 2000 Summer Olympics.

References

1967 births
Olympic baseball players of Australia
Australian baseball players
Baseball players at the 2000 Summer Olympics
Living people
Baseball players from Sydney